Rymill Bay is a bay in Antarctica. Rymill Bay was probably first seen from a distance by the French Antarctic Expedition under Jean-Baptiste Charcot in 1909. The bay was first surveyed in 1936 by the British Graham Land Expedition (BGLE), and was resurveyed in 1948 by the Falkland Islands Dependencies Survey (FIDS). The name, proposed by members of the BGLE is for John Riddoch Rymill, Australian leader of the British Graham Land Expedition.

External links
 

Bays of Graham Land
Fallières Coast